The redtail catfish, Phractocephalus hemioliopterus, is a pimelodid (long-whiskered) catfish. In Venezuela, it is known as cajaro, and in Brazil, it is known as pirarara, stemming from the Tupi language words pirá and arara. It is the only extant species of the genus Phractocephalus. This fish is common in the aquarium trade, although its massive adult size makes it unsuitable for all but the largest aquariums. They feed on fish, crustaceans and fallen fruits. They are not evaluated by IUCN.

Fossil species 
Although the redtail catfish is the only living representative of this genus, there are other members that date back to the upper Miocene, and are only known from fossil remains. P. nassi was described in 2003, from the Urumaco Formation at Urumaco, Venezuela. Another fossil species, P. acreornatus, is known from the Solimões Formation, Acre, Brazil. This genus has a minimum age of about 13.5 million years.

Description
However, this is exceptionally rare, and most do not approach this size. They average  in length. These colorful large catfishes have a brownish back, with yellow sides, and characteristic orange-red dorsal fin and caudal fin (hence the common name). Sometimes the dorsal, pelvic and anal fins are also red. They have a broad head with long whiskers, dark black body and white underneath that extends from the mouth to the caudal fin. It has a pair of barbels on the upper jaw, and two pairs on the lower jaw. Their whiskers are sensitive and have chemical reception cells which are used as the sense of smell. They breed using external fertilization after laying their eggs. They communicate by making a clicking sound to warn off potential dangers.

Distribution and habitat
The redtail catfish is native to the Amazon, Orinoco, and Essequibo river basins of South America, in Ecuador, Venezuela, Guyana, Colombia, Peru, Suriname, Bolivia, and Brazil. It is found only in fresh water, and inhabits larger rivers, streams, and lakes. They eat during the evening and night and stay motionless during the day. They are bottom-dwellers and move about quite slowly. Red-tailed catfish are territorial fish. Redtail catfish is also an invasive species in Malaysia, they are now found mostly in the Perak River and Pahang River.

Relationship to humans
Due to the potential large size of this species, redtail catfish are considered a game fish by anglers. The current IGFA world record for weight belongs to the Brazilian Gilberto Fernandes with 56 kg (123 lb 7 oz).

It is said that the natives do not eat the meat of the redtail catfish because it is black in coloration.

In Thailand, it is an alien species that has been introduced by humans, like the common pleco, zebra tilapia, and alligator gar.
In some places, it is feared because it has been believed to be the cause of the mysterious drownings of many of the passengers aboard the passenger ship Sobral Santos II when it sank.

In the aquarium

The redtail catfish is an extremely popular fish in Amazonian-themed exhibits at public aquaria, where they are often housed with other large fish, such as Colossoma macropomum or pacu, and other large catfish.

Juveniles are often available as aquarium fish, despite their eventual large size. In an aquarium where they may be well-fed, these fish can grow quite rapidly, and require tanks of at least  when fully adult. Weekly feeding is appropriate for this catfish; overfeeding is a common cause of death in this species. It feeds heavily on live and dead fishes and other meat. Even as a juvenile of only a few inches in length, they are able to swallow many of the more common aquarium fish (such as tetras or guppies), and it is only appropriate to house this fish with other species of relatively large size. Redtail catfish also have a habit of swallowing inedible objects in the aquarium. Though these are often regurgitated, both the swallowing and the regurgitation can present a problem for the fish, and these objects are best kept out of the aquarium.

The redtail catfish has been hybridized with other fish, such as the Pseudoplatystoma or Tiger Shovelnose Catfish, through the use of hormones, in attempts to create a viable food fish: the Tiger Redtail Catfish. These hybrid fish sometimes make it into the aquarium hobby under a variety of common names.

See also
List of freshwater aquarium fish species

References

Pimelodidae
Catfish of South America
Catfish
Catfish
Catfish
Catfish
Catfish
Catfish
Catfish
Catfish
Fish described in 1801